The 2007 Mongolian National Championship was the fortieth recorded edition of top flight football in Mongolia and the twelfth season of the Mongolian Premier League, which took over as the highest level of competition in the country from the previous Mongolian National Championship. Erchim were champions, their second title, Khangarid were runners up, with Khoromkhon in third place.

Participating teams

 Cowboys – Ulaanbaatar
 Erchim – Ulaanbaatar Power Plant team
 Khangarid – Erdenet; town in northern Mongolia
 Kharaatsai – Ulaanbaatar
 Khasiin Khulguud – Bank team from Ulaanbaatar
 Khoromkhon – Ulaanbaatar
 Mazaalai – Ulaanbaatar
 UB United – Ulaanbaatar
 UB College – team from Ulaanbaatar University

Format
The 2006 season consisted of two distinct stage: the first stage consisted of a league competition in which the nine competing teams all played each other twice in home and away matches. Following completion of this stage, the top four teams qualified for the second stage, the championship playoffs. This consisted of two legged semi-finals, from which the winners qualified for the final match with the losers playing a third place play off.

First stage

League table

Results

Championship playoffs

Semi-finals

Third place match

Final

Top scorers

Other honours

References

Mongolia Premier League seasons
Mongolia
Mongolia
football